The paddyfield parasol, Neurothemis intermedia, is a species of dragonfly in the family Libellulidae. It is widespread in many Asian countries. Four subspecies are recognized.

Subspecies
 Neurothemis intermedia atalanta Ris 1919
 Neurothemis intermedia degener Selys, 1879
 Neurothemis intermedia excelsa Lieftinck, 1934 
 Neurothemis intermedia intermedia (Rambur, 1842)

Description and habitat
It is a yellowish red dragonfly with reddish brown eyes. It has a broad basal amber-yellow marking at base of all wings. Its abdomen is reddish with a ventro-lateral brownish stripe interrupted at apical end of segments 3 to 8. Young males and females are more yellowish red. It is more common at sea level all along the coast but becoming rare in the hills.

See also
 List of odonates of Sri Lanka
 List of odonates of India
 List of odonata of Kerala

References

 intermedia.html World Dragonflies
 Animal diversity web
 Query Results
 Sri Lanka Biodiversity

Libellulidae
Insects described in 1842